Alberto Dainese (born 25 March 1998) is an Italian cyclist, who currently rides for UCI WorldTeam .

Major results

2016
 1st Stage 3 Giro di Basilicata
2018
 1st Trofeo Città di San Vendemiano
 Giro della Regione Friuli Venezia Giulia
1st  Points classification
1st Stage 1
 1st Stage 9 Giro Ciclistico d'Italia
 2nd Road race, National Under-23 Road Championships
 6th Gooikse Pijl
 10th Gran Premio Industrie del Marmo
2019
 1st  Road race, UEC European Under-23 Road Championships
 1st Entre Brenne et Montmorillonnais
 Tour de Normandie
1st  Points classification
1st Stage 2
 1st Stage 3 Czech Cycling Tour
 2nd Gooikse Pijl
 5th Arno Wallaard Memorial
 6th Overall Paris–Arras Tour
 6th Coppa Bernocchi
 6th Schaal Sels
 7th Overall Tour de Bretagne
1st Stages 2, 3 & 6
2020
 1st Stage 1 Herald Sun Tour
 3rd Race Torquay
2021
 2nd Paris–Chauny
 3rd Grand Prix d'Isbergues
 3rd Giro del Veneto
2022
 1st Stage 11 Giro d'Italia
 5th Circuit Franco–Belge
2023
 4th Le Samyn

Grand Tour general classification results timeline

References

External links

1998 births
Living people
Italian male cyclists
Cyclists from the Province of Padua
Italian Giro d'Italia stage winners